General elections were held in Ivory Coast on 27 November 1960 to elect a President and National Assembly.  Under the constitution enacted that year, the country was officially a one-party state with the Democratic Party of Ivory Coast – African Democratic Rally (PDCI-RDA) as the sole legal party. Its leader, Félix Houphouët-Boigny, was automatically elected to a five-year term as president and unanimously confirmed in office via a referendum.  A single list of PDCI-RDA candidates won all 70 seats in the National Assembly. Voter turnout was 95.9% in the parliamentary election and 98.8% in the presidential election.

Results

President

National Assembly

References

Ivory
1960 in Ivory Coast
Presidential elections in Ivory Coast
One-party elections
Single-candidate elections
Elections in Ivory Coast
November 1960 events in Africa